Thomas Alcock may refer to:
Thomas Alcock (adventurer) (died 1563), English adventurer
 Thomas Alcock (priest) (1709–1798), Anglican vicar, pluralist and author
 Thomas Alcock (Ordnance) (1762–1856), Treasurer of the Ordnance
 Thomas Alcock (MP) (1801–1866), Member of Parliament for Newton 1826–1830, Ludlow 1839–1840, and East Surrey 1847–1865
Thomas Alcock (surgeon) (1784–1833), English surgeon

See also
Thomas Alcock Beck (1795–1846), author